Bearsden railway station serves Bearsden, East Dunbartonshire near Glasgow, Scotland. The railway station is managed by ScotRail and lies on the Argyle Line and North Clyde Lines.

History 

The station opened along with the line to Milngavie in April 1863.

The naming is unusual in that the current title of the town (which was originally New Kilpatrick) was taken from the station name, rather than the town giving its name to the station.

Facilities
The station is well equipped, with a ticket office and ticket machine on platform 1, and shelters, benches and help points on both platforms. There is a pub and a car park and bike racks adjacent to platform 1. All of the station has step-free access, but the footbridge only has steps, so passengers needing access to platform 2 must use the ramp from Drymen Road.

Passenger volume 

The statistics cover twelve month periods that start in April.

Services

On weekdays and Saturdays, trains run every 30 minutes northbound to Milngavie, and southbound to Springburn, via Glasgow Queen Street (low level). In the evenings and on Sundays, trains run southbound to Motherwell, via Hamilton Central, at the same twice-hourly frequency.

References

External links

Video footage of Bearsden Station

Railway stations in East Dunbartonshire
Former North British Railway stations
Railway stations in Great Britain opened in 1863
SPT railway stations
Railway stations served by ScotRail
Bearsden